The Scarlet Sails is a celebration in St. Petersburg, Russia, the most massive and famous public event during the White Nights Festival every summer. The tradition is highly popular for its spectacular fireworks, numerous music concerts and a massive water show.

Description 
Crowds of about one million people are treated to a wide variety of free entertainment provided by the city of St. Petersburg. Entertainment also includes appearances by popular rock-stars, as well as the St. Petersburg Symphony Orchestra, ballet and other classical acts, performing on several stages simultaneously during the event. The show also includes a series of large-scale events on the waters of the Neva River, such as rowing and motorboat races and a massive battle with pirates culminating in the appearance of a tall ship sporting spectacular scarlet sails.

History 
This tradition began in 1968, when several Leningrad schools united to celebrate the end of the school year in connection with the symbolism of the popular 1922 children's book Scarlet Sails by Alexander Grin. During the first celebration, a brigantine with scarlet sails sailed along the English Embankment and the Admiralty Embankment towards the Winter Palace. The 1961 release of the film Scarlet Sails boosted the popularity both of the book and of the tradition.

Although there existed an early draft version of the Scarlet Sails poem, which action was staged at post-revolutionary Petrograd (St. Petersburg's russificated name before renaming to Leningrad in 1924), the author eventually put its action to a fictional country, thus making his work just a symbolic story of an all-conquering, lofty dream with no rusty revolutionary propaganda.

As a symbol of fulfilling child's dream to be adult and free from "schools and rules" the brigantine with scarlet sails turned to be an emblem of transition to a new wishfully beautiful adult life upon school-graduation. The tradition interrupted in later Soviet period, but was again reborn since 2005, when St. Petersburg authorities realized the tourist-attracting potential of the event.

Latest development 
The show has become the main part of the White Nights celebration. More than one million people attended the Scarlet Sails show celebrating the end of the 2007 school year. In 2010, public attendance grew to 3 million, with entertainers including such stars as the Cirque du Soleil, Mariinsky Ballet and Antonio Banderas.

2020 saw virtual celebration caused by COVID-19 pandemic. This celebration has been return in 2022.

References

External links

 Official site
 Youtube channel
2007 Scarlet Sails celebration in St. Petersburg: part 1, part 2, part 3, part 4

Tourist attractions in Saint Petersburg
Events in Saint Petersburg
Festivals in Russia